The 2022-23 SAFA Women's  League is the 13th consecutive season of the  SAFA Women's League.

Teams

Location of teams

Stadiums and locations

Table

(C) Champion ; (P/O) Play-offs; (R) Relegated

Awards

The awards are also sponsored by Hollywoodbets and they are held at the end of the season.

•Young player of the season
 Nthabiseng Majiya

•Goalkeeper of the season
 Katlego Moletsane

•Player of the season
 Boitumelo Rabale

•Coach of the season
 Jerry Tshabalala 

•Top goalscorer
  Nompumelelo Nyandeni

•Referee of the season
 Hloniphile Msezane

•Assistant referee of the season
 Amogelang Msiza

Nompumelelo Nyandeni claimed her second top goalscorer award, after sharing it with Andisiwe Mgcoyi last season.

Source:TimesLive

See also
2022-23 South African Premier Division

References

Women's soccer in South Africa
SAFA Women's League
2022–23 in South African soccer leagues